The North Central Service (NCS) is a Metra commuter rail line running from Union Station in downtown Chicago through northwestern and far northern suburbs to Antioch, Illinois. In December 2022, the public timetable shows seven weekday departures from Chicago. This line does not run at all on weekends or holidays. While Metra does not explicitly refer to any of its eleven routes by colors, the NCS' timetable accents are lavender, a shade of purple. It is one of two Metra lines that does not have a specific color for a fallen flag railroad that used to operate on the route.

About a mile west of River Grove, this route turns north at a junction known as tower B-12. The rest of the route operates on the Canadian National Railway's Waukesha Subdivision.

The CN assumed ownership of this route on September 7, 2001, when it absorbed the Wisconsin Central Railroad ("WC"). The WC operated on this route after it was purchased from the Soo Line Railroad in April 1987. Metra provides its own crews for this service (like with most routes) and operates under a trackage rights agreement with the CN.

Service began August 19, 1996. , this is the only new commuter line in the Metra system since its formation. Prior to the start of NCS, the last passenger service on this route ended in January 1965, when the Soo Line discontinued the overnight Chicago-Duluth Laker.

The North Central Service serves O'Hare International Airport, but with a limited number of trains. O'Hare has much more frequent service from the CTA Blue Line.

As of December 12, 2022, Metra operates 14 trains (seven in each direction) on the line on weekdays, with all trains running the full length of the route from Antioch to Union Station.

Like the Heritage Corridor and SouthWest Service, the North Central Service is fully ADA-accessible.

No tickets are sold at any North Central Service stations outside Chicago. Passengers must purchase tickets either on the train or with Ventra.

Recent history 
On January 30, 2006 four new stations on the North Central Service opened: Franklin Park, Schiller Park, Rosemont, and Washington Street. Another station, at Grand and Cicero Avenues in Chicago (between the Western Avenue and River Grove stops), was built in 2006. Service doubled from 10 to 20 trains per day with this change in the timetable, combined with double tracking of large portions of the line and the CN rerouting freight traffic south of Mundelein.

On September 11, 2006 service expanded from 20 to 22 trains when Metra split one rush-hour local train in each direction into two express trains.

Notably, the line goes through Des Plaines but does not have a station there. The station in Des Plaines was on Thacker Street and closed in 1965. However, Des Plaines is currently serviced by the Union Pacific/Northwest Line.

Metra has considered adding weekend service to the North Central Service ever since Saturday service was added to the SouthWest Service, and has also considered operating six trains between Chicago and Antioch, like the SouthWest Service.

On February 5, 2018 service was reduced from 22 to 20 trains when Metra combined two rush-hour express trains into one rush hour semi-express.

As of April 2021, NCS service is limited to rush hours in the peak direction only–towards Chicago in the morning and towards Antioch in the afternoon. This makes the NCS one of 3 Metra lines (along with the Heritage Corridor and the SouthWest Service) to only offer peak service.

Ridership
Between 2014 and 2019, annual ridership declined 12.5% from 1,817,335 to 1,589,905. Due to the COVID-19 pandemic, ridership dropped to 340,682 passengers in 2020 and to 146,668 passengers in 2021.

Stations

References 

 J. David Ingles, Ready or not, here we come, Trains November 1996

External links 

 Metra North Central Service schedule

Metra lines
Soo Line Railroad